Japan–Kosovo relations are foreign relations between Japan and Kosovo. Kosovo declared its independence from Serbia on February 17, 2008, and Japan recognized it on March 18, 2008. According to the Japanese Ministry of Foreign Affairs, Japan and Kosovo established diplomatic relations on February 25, 2009.

History 

Dr. Sadako Ogata, the late Japanese-born UN High Commissioner for Refugees, issued an official statement in November 1998, which revealed the violence and abuse that civilians in Kosovo faced every day and an estimated 175,000 people remained displaced inside Kosovo. She demonstrated on the report a lasting commitment to protect Kosovar refugees and returnees and to seek solutions to relevant problems there. In order to cease the appalling violence and to regain peace and prosperity in Kosovo as soon as possible, the Government of Japan declared in April 1999 to provide assistance to international organizations and the neighboring countries which accepted numerous Kosovar refugees, including the UNHCR, Albania and Macedonia.

Kosovo declared its independence from Serbia on February 17, 2008, and Japan recognized it on March 18, 2008. Japan is the third Asian country which recognized the Republic of Kosovo after Afghanistan and Turkey.

Embassy of Kosovo was opened in Tokyo on July 16, 2010. On the other hand, Japan had no embassy in Prishtina until January 1, 2020.

Japanese Prime Minister Shinzo Abe, the most long-standing Prime Minister in the entire history of Japan, proposed the launch of the Western Balkans Cooperation Initiative on his visit to several Southeast European countries in January 2018. Despite the fact that he did not visit Kosovo at that time, the scheme emphasized that Japan would strengthen bilateral assistance, support regional cooperation and establish new embassies to the Western Balkan countries including the Republic of Kosovo. As a part of the initiative, two years later, Embassy of Japan was opened in Prishtina.

High-level visits

High-level visits from Japan to Kosovo 
 December 1999: Foreign Minister Yōhei Kōno
 April 2005: Parliamentary Secretary for Foreign Affairs Itsunori Onodera
 May 2006: Vice-Minister for Foreign Affairs Akiko Yamanaka
 September 2009: Parliamentary Vice-Minister for Foreign Affairs Kazuyuki Hamada
 February 2018: Parliamentary Vice-Minister for Foreign Affairs Manabu Horii
 February 2019: State Minister for Foreign Affairs Toshiko Abe

High-level visits from Kosovo to Japan 
 (February 2000: UNMIK Special Representative Bernard Kouchner)
 April 2004: Prime Minister Bajram Rexhepi
 December 2011: Minister of Foreign Affairs Enver Hoxhaj and Minister of Environment and Spatial Planning Dardan Gashi
 June 2012: Prime Minister Hashim Thaçi with Minister of Foreign Affairs Enver Hoxhaj, Minister of Education, Science and Technology  and Minister of Finance Bedri Hamza
 September 2013:  Bernard Nikaj with Chief Executive at Investment Promotion Agency Valdrin Lluka
 October 2013: Minister of Education, Science and Technology Ramë Buja
 April 2014: Prime Minister Hashim Thaçi with Minister of Finance  and Minister of Trade and Industry Bernard Nikaj
 March 2018: First Deputy Prime Minister and Minister of Foreign Affairs Behgjet Pacolli with  Valdrin Lluka
 March 2019: Chairman of Kosovo Assembly Kadri Veseli
 September 2019: President Hashim Thaçi
 October 2019: President Hashim Thaçi
 July 2021: President Vjosa Osmani

Sports 
Judo, a Japanese origin martial art, included into the Summer Olympic Games as an official sport for men in 1964 and for women in 1992. Kosovo Judo Federation was accepted into the International Judo Federation and the European Judo Union in 2012. Kosovar-Albanian judoka Majlinda Kelmendi achieved a great success and victory by winning the first gold medal for Kosovo at the 2016 Summer Olympics in Rio de Janeiro. Kosovan judoka Distria Krasniqi won the gold medal in women's under 48kg competition at the Tokyo 2020 Olympics, held in 2021 due to the global COVID-19 pandemic; it is the first gold medal for Kosovo at the Tokyo 2020 and the second for Kosovo at the Olympic Games.

Notes and references 
Notes:

References:

See also 

 Foreign relations of Japan
 Foreign relations of Kosovo
 Japan–Serbia relations
 Japan–Yugoslavia relations

External links 
 Embassy of Japan in Kosovo
 Embassy of Kosovo in Japan 

 
Japan
Kosovo